The 1970 Maine Black Bears football team was an American football team that represented the University of Maine as a member of the Yankee Conference during the 1970 NCAA College Division football season. In its fourth season under head coach Walter Abbott, the team compiled a 3–5 record (1–4 against conference opponents) and finished fifth out of six teams in the Yankee Conference. Robert Hamilton and Henry James were the team captains.

Schedule

References

Maine
Maine Black Bears football seasons
Maine Black Bears football